The oatmeal ball or the chocolate ball is a type of unbaked pastry that is a popular Danish and Swedish confectionery.

Oatmeal balls consist of oatmeal, sugar, cocoa, vanilla sugar, butter, and sometimes a small amount of coffee mixed until they become a compact mass. To make them creamier and softer, some people also like to mix in a splash of cream. From the dough, balls are hand-formed to a size usually slightly smaller than golf balls, then rolled in shredded coconut or sprinkles. The balls can be eaten immediately, but usually they are first chilled in a refrigerator.

Because of the simple, non-bake recipe, oatmeal balls can be quickly made by anyone, which makes them one of the most popular homemade sweets and a common sight at children's parties.

Variations on the oatmeal ball are popular in other countries too. Popular in Austria, especially around Christmastime, is the Rumkugel (plural Rumkugeln), which contains the same ingredients as oatmeal balls but adds a small amount of rum to the mix.

History 
The oatmeal ball was most likely invented during World War II, when, because of rationing, there was a limited supply of wheat flour, which caused a search for substitutes. In 1943, the Danish Nationaltidende published a small booklet for housewives called Ingenuity in a time of crisis containing the recipe for havregrynskugle. There is also a classified ad for a konditorei product with the name negerbollar from 1918 in the Swedish newspaper Svenska Dagbladet.

Names in Swedish 

In the 13th (2006) edition, the pastry can be found under both names, with a comment that  is the recommended term. In the 14th edition (2015)  was removed.

In mid-2003, a bakery owner from Sjöbo was reported to the Swedish Ombudsman against Ethnic Discrimination for using the word  on a sign in her bakery shop. However, the case was dismissed since the person reporting it did not consider herself personally insulted.

Note that the Danish word  is a similarly dated term for a similar but different confection, namely the flødebolle.

See also 
 Bourbon ball
 Brigadeiro
 Chocolate truffle
 Rum ball

References

External links 

 Chokladboll recipe

Danish confectionery
Foods containing coconut
Chocolate desserts
Oat-based dishes